Blacklake is a census-designated place in San Luis Obispo County, California. The 2010 United States census reported Blacklake's population was 930.

Blacklake (or Blacklake Village) is an area of residential subdivisions surrounding the Blacklake Golf Resort, and is located between Nipomo and Callender, California.

Geography
According to the United States Census Bureau, the CDP covers an area of 1.0 square miles (2.7 km2), all of it land.

Demographics

The 2010 United States Census reported that Blacklake had a population of 930. The racial makeup of Blacklake was 865 (93.0%) White, 8 (0.9%) African American, 7 (0.8%) Native American, 24 (2.6%) Asian, 0 (0.0%) Pacific Islander, 14 (1.5%) from other races, and 12 (1.3%) from two or more races. Hispanic or Latino of any race were 70 persons (7.5%).

The Census reported that 930 people (100% of the population) lived in households, 0 (0%) lived in non-institutionalized group quarters, and 0 (0%) were institutionalized.

There were 472 households, out of which 39 (8.3%) had children under the age of 18 living in them, 326 (69.1%) were opposite-sex married couples living together, 9 (1.9%) had a female householder with no husband present, 6 (1.3%) had a male householder with no wife present.  There were 13 (2.8%) unmarried opposite-sex partnerships, and 4 (0.8%) same-sex married couples or partnerships. 111 households (23.5%) were made up of individuals, and 80 (16.9%) had someone living alone who was 65 years of age or older. The average household size was 1.97.  There were 341 families (72.2% of all households); the average family size was 2.28.

The population was spread out, with 70 people (7.5%) under the age of 18, 10 people (1.1%) aged 18 to 24, 83 people (8.9%) aged 25 to 44, 240 people (25.8%) aged 45 to 64, and 527 people (56.7%) who were 65 years of age or older.  The median age was 66.9 years. For every 100 females, there were 94.2 males.  For every 100 females age 18 and over, there were 91.1 males.

The homeowner vacancy rate was 2.6%; the rental vacancy rate was 23.6%.  779 people (83.8% of the population) lived in owner-occupied housing units and 151 people (16.2%) lived in rental housing units.

References

External links
Blacklake Golf Resort

Census-designated places in San Luis Obispo County, California
Census-designated places in California